BBC Yorkshire is one of the English regions of the BBC. It was formed from the division of the former BBC North region into BBC Yorkshire and BBC Yorkshire and Lincolnshire, based in Kingston upon Hull. Serving West, North and South Yorkshire and the northern Midlands.

Services

Television
BBC Yorkshires television output consists of the flagship regional news service Look North, the topical magazine programme Inside Out and a 20-minute opt-out during Sunday Politics. BBC Yorkshire also co-produces the rugby league highlights programme The Super League Show, which is simulcast in the North West, North East & Cumbria and East Yorkshire & Lincolnshire regions on Monday nights.

Radio
The region is the controlling centre for BBC Radio Leeds, BBC Radio York and BBC Radio Sheffield.

The three stations simulcast networked programming during the evenings and late night.

Online and Interactive
BBC Yorkshire also produces regional news and local radio pages for BBC Red Button and BBC Local News websites for each county.

History

The regional operation from Leeds began in 1968, when the original BBC North region was broken up into BBC North, BBC North West and BBC North East, with the BBC North name being transferred from Manchester to the new operation in Leeds. The new operation was called BBC North''' until 2002.

In 2002, viewers on the Belmont transmitter transferred to the BBC Yorkshire and Lincolnshire service, and the service began to use the on-screen name of BBC Yorkshire''. This was made official in 2004, when both the Leeds operation, and the East Yorkshire and Lincolnshire operation in Hull, moved into new premises.

Studios
The first Leeds base for BBC North, upon the launch of regional television was a converted studio in All Souls Church, where the service was based until 1974. From then, the television service moved into Old Broadcasting House at Woodhouse Lane, Leeds, where some services such as BBC Radio Leeds had already been broadcasting. This building was originally the Society of Friends' (Quakers') Carlton Hill Meeting House; the building itself was of two ages, one part made of stone with columns, and another made of concrete, and featuring the BBC Coat of arms moulded into the front of the building.

In 2004, however, the equipment required replacing and new premises were built by Birse Group. All of BBC Yorkshire's Leeds-based facilities moved to the new building, located in St. Peter's Square at Quarry Hill, which included state-of-the-art computer systems, new digital studios for BBC Radio Leeds, and new technology that allowed the programme to be broadcast in widescreen.

In addition to St. Peter's Square, BBC Yorkshire also has radio studios and television bureaux located in York and Sheffield.

See also

BBC English Regions
BBC Radio Sheffield
BBC Radio York
BBC Radio Humberside
BBC Radio Leeds

References

External links

Yorkshire